God Bless the Go-Go's  is the fourth studio album by the American rock band the Go-Go's, released on May 15, 2001. 

It was their first studio album in 17 years since the release of Talk Show in 1984. As of 2022, this is the band's most recent album.

Critical reception and chart performance

God Bless the Go-Go's received a score of 68 out of 100 from Metacritic based on generally favorable reviews from critics. Allmusic wrote, "Every bit as Go-Go's, that is, as their non-hits and less remarkable material. While the Go-Go's sound is intact, there is not a "We Got the Beat" or a "Head Over Heels" to be found. It is feasible that in this age of pop rebirth, the Go-Go's decided it was now or never." Rolling Stone wrote "The album doesn't attempt to update the band's sound with hip-hop moves or electronic frippery, for which God should bless 'em, indeed. The girls' hold on the current pop world remains so strong that Green Day's Billie Joe Armstrong co-writes a song ("Unforgiven") in impeccable Go-Go's drag."

The album sold fewer copies than the previous Go-Go's studio albums and peaked on the U.S. Billboard 200 at number 57.

Two singles were released from the album; "Unforgiven" and "Apology."

Track listing

Personnel
Credits adapted from the liner notes of God Bless the Go-Go's.
Band members
 Belinda Carlisle – lead vocals
 Charlotte Caffey – lead guitar, piano, backing vocals
 Jane Wiedlin – rhythm guitar, backing vocals
 Kathy Valentine – bass, backing vocals
 Gina Schock – drums

Additional musicians
Billie Joe Armstrong – additional guitar and vocals on "Unforgiven"
Rami Jaffee – Mellotron and Chamberlin on "Here You Are"
Peggy Baldwin – cello on "Here You Are"
Roger Manning – Mellotron on "Daisy Chain"

Production
Paul Q. Kolderie, Sean Slade – producers, engineers, mixing at Record Plant, Fort Apache Studios, Magic Shop Studios and Record One
Rick Neigher – producer and engineer on track 6
Mike Shipley – mixing of tracks 1-4
Marc DeSisto – mixing of track 6 at Skip Saylor, Los Angeles
Tom Weir – mixing of track 13
Mike King, Matt Levella, Chris Reynolds, Jaymz Hardy-Martin III – assistants
Steve Hall – mastering at Future Disc

Charts

References

External links
 

2001 albums
The Go-Go's albums
Albums produced by Sean Slade
Albums produced by Paul Q. Kolderie
Albums recorded at Sound City Studios